In predicate logic, an existential quantification is a type of quantifier, a logical constant which is interpreted as "there exists", "there is at least one", or "for some". It is usually denoted by the logical operator symbol ∃, which, when used together with a predicate variable, is called an existential quantifier ("" or "" or "). Existential quantification is distinct from universal quantification ("for all"), which asserts that the property or relation holds for all members of the domain. Some sources use the term existentialization to refer to existential quantification.

Basics 
Consider a formula that states that some natural number multiplied by itself is 25.
 0·0 = 25, or 1·1 = 25, or 2·2 = 25, or 3·3 = 25, ...
This would seem to be a logical disjunction because of the repeated use of "or". However, the ellipses make this impossible to integrate and to interpret it as a disjunction in formal logic.
Instead, the statement could be rephrased more formally as
For some natural number n, n·n = 25.
This is a single statement using existential quantification.

This statement is more precise than the original one, since the phrase "and so on" does not necessarily include all natural numbers and exclude everything else. And since the domain was not stated explicitly, the phrase could not be interpreted formally. In the quantified statement, however, the natural numbers are mentioned explicitly.

This particular example is true, because 5 is a natural number, and when we substitute 5 for n, we produce "5·5 = 25", which is true.
It does not matter that "n·n = 25" is only true for a single natural number, 5; even the existence of a single solution is enough to prove this existential quantification as being true.
In contrast, "For some even number n, n·n = 25" is false, because there are no even solutions.

The domain of discourse, which specifies the values the variable n is allowed to take, is therefore critical to a statement's trueness or falseness. Logical conjunctions are used to restrict the domain of discourse to fulfill a given predicate. For example:
For some positive odd number n, n·n = 25 
is logically equivalent to
For some natural number n, n is odd and n·n = 25.
Here, "and" is the logical conjunction.

In symbolic logic, "∃" (a rotated letter "E", in a sans-serif font) is used to indicate existential quantification.
 
is the (true) statement
 For some natural number n, n·n = 25.
Similarly, if Q(n) is the predicate "n is even", then
 
is the (false) statement
 For some natural number n, n is even and n·n = 25.

In mathematics, the proof of a "some" statement may be achieved either by a constructive proof, which exhibits an object satisfying the "some" statement, or by a nonconstructive proof, which shows that there must be such an object but without exhibiting one.

Properties

Negation 
A quantified propositional function is a statement; thus, like statements, quantified functions can be negated.  The  symbol is used to denote negation.

For example, if P(x) is the predicate "x is greater than 0 and less than 1", then, for a domain of discourse X of all natural numbers, the existential quantification "There exists a natural number x which is greater than 0 and less than 1" can be symbolically stated as:

This can be demonstrated to be false. Truthfully, it must be said, "It is not the case that there is a natural number x that is greater than 0 and less than 1", or, symbolically:
.

If there is no element of the domain of discourse for which the statement is true, then it must be false for all of those elements.  That is, the negation of

is logically equivalent to "For any natural number x, x is not greater than 0 and less than 1", or:

Generally, then, the negation of a propositional function's existential quantification is a universal quantification of that propositional function's negation; symbolically,

(This is a generalization of De Morgan's laws to predicate logic.)

A common error is stating "all persons are not married" (i.e., "there exists no person who is married"), when "not all persons are married" (i.e., "there exists a person who is not married") is intended:

Negation is also expressible through a statement of "for no", as opposed to "for some":

Unlike the universal quantifier, the existential quantifier distributes over logical disjunctions:

Rules of inference 

A rule of inference is a rule justifying a logical step from hypothesis to conclusion. There are several rules of inference which utilize the existential quantifier.

Existential introduction (∃I) concludes that, if the propositional function is known to be true for a particular element of the domain of discourse, then it must be true that there exists an element for which the proposition function is true.  Symbolically,

Existential instantiation, when conducted in a Fitch style deduction, proceeds by entering a new sub-derivation while substituting an existentially quantified variable for a subject—which does not appear within any active sub-derivation. If a conclusion can be reached within this sub-derivation in which the substituted subject does not appear, then one can exit that sub-derivation with that conclusion. The reasoning behind existential elimination (∃E) is as follows: If it is given that there exists an element for which the proposition function is true, and if a conclusion can be reached by giving that element an arbitrary name, that conclusion is necessarily true, as long as it does not contain the name. Symbolically, for an arbitrary c and for a proposition Q in which c does not appear:

 must be true for all values of c over the same domain X; else, the logic does not follow: If c is not arbitrary, and is instead a specific element of the domain of discourse, then stating P(c) might unjustifiably give more information about that object.

The empty set 
The formula  is always false, regardless of P(x). This is because  denotes the empty set, and no x of any description – let alone an x fulfilling a given predicate P(x) – exist in the empty set. See also Vacuous truth for more information.

As adjoint 

In category theory and the theory of elementary topoi, the existential quantifier can be understood as the left adjoint of a functor between power sets, the inverse image functor of a function between sets; likewise, the universal quantifier is the right adjoint.

Encoding

In TeX, the symbol is produced with "\exists".

See also 
 Existential clause
 Existence theorem
 First-order logic
 Lindström quantifier
 List of logic symbols – for the unicode symbol ∃
 Quantifier variance
 Uniqueness quantification

Notes

References 

Logic symbols
Quantifier (logic)